David Lane Johnson (born May 8, 1990) is an American football offensive tackle for the Philadelphia Eagles of the National Football League (NFL). He was drafted by the Eagles fourth overall in the 2013 NFL Draft. He played college football at Oklahoma.

Early years
Johnson was born in Groveton, Texas, and attended Groveton High School, where he played football and competed in track. In football, he was an honorable mention All-state selection as a quarterback, and was named All-district.

In track & field, Johnson competed in the throwing events. He earned a fourth-place finish in the shot put event at the 2008 UIL 1A State Championships, with a top-throw of 15.21 meters (49 ft 7 in).

College career
Johnson attended Kilgore College, a junior college in east Texas, and played quarterback and tight end for the Kilgore Rangers football team for the 2008 season. In his sole year at Kilgore, Johnson amassed 584 passing yards for 7 touchdowns and 3 interceptions with a 52.4% completion rate while at quarterback.

After his freshman year, he transferred to the University of Oklahoma, where he played for the Oklahoma Sooners football team from 2009 to 2012.  Originally serving as a practice squad quarterback during his redshirt season, Lane Johnson transitioned to tight end in the fall of 2010 and switched again to defensive end for the spring of 2011. After two starting linemen went down with injuries at the beginning of the 2011 fall season, offensive line coach Bruce Kittle asked multiple players, including Lane Johnson, to try out as back-up linemen to fill in the missing roster depth. Kittle was amazed by Johnson's footwork and natural pass blocking abilities and immediately switched Johnson to offensive tackle. Two games later, Johnson would be named the Sooners' starting right tackle, and he would start the remaining 12 games of the season. As a senior in 2012, he switched to left tackle and started 11 of 13 games and was named a third-team All-American by CBSSports.com.

Professional career
On December 21, 2012, it was announced that Johnson and teammate Landry Jones had accepted their invitations to the 2013 Senior Bowl. Throughout Senior Bowl practices, Johnson demonstrated impressive footwork, body control, and balance while diagnosing pass rushes and disrupting them. He was named a top standout during practice by NFL analyst Bucky Brooks and immensely helped his draft stock to put himself in the first round discussion. On January 26, 2013, he played offensive tackle in the Reese's Senior Bowl and was part of Detroit Lions' head coach Jim Schwartz's South team that defeated the North 21-16. Johnson was one of 57 collegiate offensive linemen that attended the NFL Scouting Combine in Indianapolis, Indiana. He completed all of the combine drills and finished first in the vertical jump and second amongst all offensive linemen in the 40-yard dash and broad jump. On March 13, 2013, Johnson attended Oklahoma's pro day, along with Landry Jones, Tony Jefferson, Demontre Hurst, Kenny Stills, Stacy McGee, and 19 other prospects. During the draft process, Johnson attended multiple private workouts and visits, including the Carolina Panthers, New York Jets, and Philadelphia Eagles. At the conclusion of the pre-draft process, Johnson was projected to be a guaranteed first round pick by NFL draft experts and scouts and was projected be a top ten selection. He was ranked the third best offensive tackle prospect in the draft by NFLDraftScout.com, NFL analyst Mike Mayock, and NFL analyst Josh Norris.

2013
The Philadelphia Eagles selected Johnson in the first round (fourth overall) of the 2013 NFL Draft. He was the third offensive tackle selected in 2013, behind Central Michigan's Eric Fisher and Texas A&M's Luke Joeckel. On July 20, 2013, the Eagles signed Johnson to a four-year, $19.85 million contract with a signing bonus of $12.81 million.

He entered training camp behind veteran Dennis Kelly on the Eagles depth chart. He competed against Kelly for the starting right tackle role throughout training camp. He became the apparent starting right tackle during training camp when it was reported that Kelly would miss the majority of the season after undergoing back surgery.

He made his first career start and professional regular season debut in the Philadelphia Eagles' season-opening 33-27 victory at the Washington Redskins. He started all 16 regular season games as a rookie and helped the Philadelphia Eagles finish first in the NFC East with a 10-6 record. On January 4, 2014, Johnson started his first career playoff game as the Philadelphia Eagles lost to the New Orleans Saints 26-24 in the NFC Wildcard game. He was ranked as the 26th best right tackle by Pro Football Focus in 2013.

2014
On June 30, 2014, it was reported that Johnson had tested positive for performance-enhancing drugs and would be suspended for the first four games of the 2014 season. Although Johnson missed the first four games of the season, he allowed only one sack in the remainder of the year and started 14 consecutive games while being graded as the second best right tackle and was ranked the 13th overall offensive linemen by Pro Football Focus. Pro Football Focus named Johnson to the 2014 PFF All-Pro Team. The Philadelphia Eagles finished second in the NFC East with a 10-6 record and did not qualify for the playoffs.

2015
Johnson played through numerous injuries, but started all 16 games, including two games at left tackle after Jason Peters was inactive after suffering a back injury. Pro Football Focus ranked Johnson tenth best right tackle in 2015 with an overall grade of +14.5. Offensive coordinator Pat Shurmur was named interim head coach for Week 17 after head coach Chip Kelly was fired after Week 16 with the Eagles finishing 7-9.

2016
On January 29, 2016, Johnson signed a six-year, $63 million extension with $35.5 million guaranteed. This contract made Johnson the highest paid right tackle in the NFL. Johnson entered training camp slated as the Eagles' starting right tackle, opposite Jason Peters.

On August 9, 2016, it was reported that Johnson would face a ten-game suspension due to PED violations. Johnson stated that he was unaware the substance he failed for was banned and that the NFLPA's player app didn't have the banned substance listed. On October 11, 2016, his ten-game suspension was upheld. The suspension voided the last year of his contract and also voided all remaining base salary guarantees that totaled $7.74 million. Allen Barbre replaced Johnson during his absence.

Johnson returned to the team for their Week 16 game against the New York Giants on December 22, 2016. Johnson has an ongoing lawsuit against the NFL and the NFL Players Association stemming from his 10-game suspension for his second failed drug test.

The Philadelphia Eagles' offensive line was ranked eighth in the league by Pro Football Focus. They also gave Johnson a run blocking grade of 86.7 and he was ranked sixth among all right tackles. Due to the suspension, Johnson only started six games in 2016 (Week 1-5, 16-17). The Philadelphia Eagles finished fourth in the NFC East with a 7-9 record in their first season under head coach Doug Pederson.

2017

Johnson remained the Eagles' starting right tackle in 2017. He suffered a concussion during a Week 5 victory over the Arizona Cardinals. Johnson remained in the concussion protocol and missed the Eagles' next game that took place five days later on Thursday Night Football. He started 15 games to help the Eagles achieve a 13-3 record and go from worst to first, finishing atop the NFC East division after finishing last in 2016.

On December 19, 2017, Johnson was named to his first Pro Bowl along with right guard Brandon Brooks. Near the end of the season, Johnson received an overall grade of 85.2 and ranked fifth amongst all offensive tackles by Pro Football Focus. He was ranked the top right tackle and received a $250,000 bonus for making the Pro Bowl. Johnson did not attend the Pro Bowl as the Eagles would play in Super Bowl LII. He was ranked 95th by his peers on the NFL Top 100 Players of 2018.

Johnson and Chris Long wore rubber masks of a German Shepherd (symbolic of the team's underdog status) after the 2017 Divisional playoff game versus the Atlanta Falcons, as the Falcons were considered favorites to win. Following the game, Philadelphia Eagles fans bought so many dog masks from Amazon that they were sold out. In Super Bowl LII, the Eagles defeated the New England Patriots 41-33 to give Johnson his first Super Bowl ring.

2019–2020
On November 29, 2019, Johnson signed a four-year, $72 million contract extension with the Eagles with $54.595 million guaranteed, making him the highest-paid offensive lineman in the NFL.

Johnson was placed on the reserve/COVID-19 list by the Eagles on July 29, 2020. He was activated on August 11, 2020. He was placed on injured reserve on December 2, 2020.

2021

In the middle of the season, Johnson sat out 3 games due to a battle with depression.

In the December 26th division match vs the New York Giants, Johnson was declared an eligible receiver for a play and caught a pass from Jalen Hurts for a 5 yard touchdown, his first ever touchdown catch.

The Associated Press named him a second-team All Pro for the 2021 season.

2022

On December 11, 2022 Lane Johnson set an NFL record of not allowing a sack in 26 consecutive games. Johnson and the Eagles reached Super Bowl LVII, which they lost to the Kansas City Chiefs, 38–35.

Personal life
Johnson married his wife Chelsea Goodman in January 2013 and they have three children together. She attended the NFL Draft with him and they met at Oklahoma where Chelsea was a high jumper. His father-in-law is John Goodman, who played defensive end for the Pittsburgh Steelers from -.

On May 22, 2019, Johnson donated $500,000 to Kilgore College for the development of "The Lane" Athletic Performance Center, a 3,800 square-foot training facility that opened March 3, 2021 on the Kilgore College campus. Johnson was on campus that day for a grand opening of the facility.

Johnson and Eagles teammates Jason Kelce and Jordan Mailata released the Christmas album A Philly Special Christmas in 2022.

References

External links
 
 Philadelphia Eagles bio
 Oklahoma Sooners bio

1990 births
Living people
People from Groveton, Texas
Players of American football from Texas
American football offensive tackles
Kilgore Rangers football players
Oklahoma Sooners football players
Philadelphia Eagles players
National Conference Pro Bowl players